Fantomas Against Fantomas is a 1949 French mystery thriller film directed by Robert Vernay and starring Marcelle Chantal, Aimé Clariond and Alexandre Rignault. It portrays the fictional master criminal Fantomas, who has had numerous films depicting his adventures.

The film's sets were designed by the art director Raymond Gabutti.

Partial cast

References

Bibliography

External links 
 

1949 films
1940s mystery thriller films
French mystery thriller films
1940s French-language films
Films directed by Robert Vernay
Pathé films
Fantômas films
French black-and-white films
1940s French films